The West Gippsland Football Netball Competition (WGFNC) is an Australian rules football and netball league in the West Gippsland region of Victoria, Australia.  The competition comprises four grades of football (seniors, reserves, under-18 and under-16) and six
grades of netball (A-grade, B-grade, C-grade, 17-&-Under, 15-&-Under and 13-&-Under).

The competition is not to be confused with the former West Gippsland Football League which merged with the Gippsland Latrobe Football League at the end of 2001 to form the West Gippsland Latrobe Football League.

History
A Senior Leagues Review that commenced at the beginning of 2015, conducted by AFL Gippsland to address issues of competitive imbalance and club sustainability, brought major change to structure of the lower Gippsland area.

The West Gippsland Football Netball Competition in its present incarnation began in 2017 as part of the AFL Gippsland Senior Football Leagues Review of 2015–16.
Five teams from the Ellinbank & District Football League became founding members  - Cora Lynn, Nar Nar Goon, Koo Wee Rup, Bunyip and Garfield - while five teams crossed over from the Alberton Football League - Phillip Island, Kilcunda Bass, Dalyston, Inverloch Kongwak and Korumburra-Bena.

2017 season
The first ever WGFNC match was played as a stand-alone night game between Cora Lynn and Inverloch-Kongwak. Both teams would enjoy a successful season finishing 2nd and 1st on the ladder respectively. They wouldn't end up meeting again until they played each other in the semi-finals.

The inaugural WGFNC grand final was again contested between Inverloch-Kongwak and Cora Lynn at Wonthaggi recreation reserve. Both teams had competed in grand finals the year before. Inverloch-Kongwak were coming off a 17-point defeat at the hands of Fish Creek in the Alberton Football League the year before, whilst Cora Lynn were on a streak of 3 successive premierships.

Inverloch-Kongwak dominated the match, defeating Cora Lynn by a massive 95-points.
The victory was Inverloch-Kongwak's seventh senior premiership, their first since 1986.

2018 season
Twelve months later, Phillip Island defeated Koo Wee Rup by a massive 99-points in what was one of the most one-sided grand finals in country football history. Koo Wee Rup who had finished in third position on the ladder failed to kick a single goal, instead score scoring just 3-points for the entire match. 
The win marked Phillip Island's fifth senior premiership, having won one four years prior in the Alberton Football League.

In the 2018 AFL Gippsland League Review, saw Tooradin Dalmore and Warragul Industrials approved to relocate into the West Gippsland League from the 2019 season, expanding the competition to twelve clubs.

2019 season
For the 2019 season the league had expanded with Tooradin-Dalmore and Warragul Industrials joining the WGFNC in 2019.
Phillips Island and Cora Lynn would both start the season very well, remaining undefeated for the first eight rounds. This run looked to be under threat for one of the teams when they were scheduled to play each other in round 9 at the Cowes recreation reserve.
Unexpectedly, both teams managed to retain their undefeated record with the match concluding in a thrilling drawn result. Onlookers agreed that this was the most fitting result, with many witnesses to the game describing it as one of the best games of country football they had ever seen.

Phillip Island would go on to maintain their undefeated record for the rest of the home & away season whilst Cora Lynn would finish second on the ladder having lost only two.

The two clubs would only meet again in the grand final. A cloudy day at the Garfield recreation reserve, would see Phillip Island get the early upper hand  before Cora Lynn kick a few goals to again make it a close contest.

In another close affair between the two clubs, Phillip Island would their second consecutive premiership, this time by only 4-points in the closest WGFNC grand final yet.
It was a day for close games with the reserve grade seeing Tooradin-Dalmore defeating Koo Wee Rup with a goal after the siren.

2020 season cancellation
The COVID-19 pandemic meant that 2020 season was cancelled due to government restrictions for sport and recreation. Efforts were made to run a modified junior competition, however further restrictions meant that these plans had to be abandoned, with a focus to return to normal competition in 2021.

Clubs

Present Clubs

Season Structure

Pre-season
The West Gippsland Football Netball Competition like most country leagues does not have a formal Pre-season competition. As part of their Pre-season preparation clubs will often schedule between one and two practice matches with clubs from other leagues prior to the season beginning. These matches could take on different structures and were primarily conducted on a non-official basis with limited match officials and scores not being recorded.

Premiership season
The West Gippsland home-and-away season lasts for 18 rounds, starting in mid April and ending in mid August. As of the 2017 season, each team plays 18 matches. Teams receive four premiership points for a win and two premiership points for a draw. Ladder finishing positions are based on the number of premiership points won, and "percentage" (calculated as the ratio of points scored to points conceded throughout the season) is used as a tie-breaker when teams finish with equal premiership points.

Finals series
Since its inception until 2017 the West Gippsland finals have consisted of a 'Top-5' finals system.

The top five teams at the end of the West Gippsland home & away season compete in a four-week finals series throughout August, culminating in a grand final to determine the premiers. The finals series is played under the 'Top-5' Page playoff system, and the grand final is played on the afternoon of the last Saturday in August or the first Saturday of September.

The winning team receives a silver premiership cup, a premiership flag – a new one of each is manufactured each year. The flag has been presented since the league began and is traditionally unfurled at the team's first home game of the following season. Additionally, each player in the grand final-winning team receives a premiership medallion.

In 2020 it was decided that the finals system would expand to a 'Top-6'.

2019 Finals series

Awards
The following major individual awards and accolades are presented each season:
Best & fairest award — to the fairest and best player in the league, voted by the umpires
Leading goal kicker award — for the player who scores the most goals during the home & away season
AFL Victoria Country Medal — the best player on the ground in the Grand Final
Team of the year — a squad of 24 players deemed the best in their positions
Most disciplined club award — for the club who receives the most discipline points, voted by the umpires

Team of the Year

Award Winners

2017 Ladder

2017 Finals series

2018 Ladder

2018 Finals series

2019 Ladder

2019 Finals series

2022 Ladder

2022 Finals series

References

External links
West Gippsland Football Netball League

Australian rules football competitions in Victoria (Australia)
Gippsland (region)
Netball leagues in Victoria (Australia)